Kibamba is an administrative ward in the Ubungo district of the Dar es Salaam Region of Tanzania. In 2016 the Tanzania National Bureau of Statistics report there were 36,171 people in the ward, from 28,885 in 2012.

References

Kinondoni District
Wards of Dar es Salaam Region